NECOM House (formerly NITEL Tower and before that, the NET Building) is a skyscraper located in Lagos. The 32-story building was completed in 1979, and houses the headquarters of NITEL. The communications spire at the top of the tower serves as a lighthouse beacon for Lagos Harbour. The building is constructed of concrete. The building was the tallest in West Africa at the time of completion.

Fire
Necom House has suffered two fires since it was built; one in 1983 which caused considerable damage to the building, and the other in 2015 which affected the top of the building.

Gallery

See also
Skyscraper design and construction
List of tallest buildings in Nigeria
List of tallest buildings in Africa

References

External links
Skyscraper profile

Commercial buildings completed in 1979
Skyscraper office buildings in Lagos
20th-century architecture in Nigeria